Paul Romand (25 September 1930 – 1 July 2011) was a French skier. He competed at the 1956 Winter Olympics, the 1960 Winter Olympics and the 1964 Winter Olympics.

References

External links
 

1930 births
2011 deaths
French male biathletes
French male cross-country skiers
Olympic biathletes of France
Olympic cross-country skiers of France
Biathletes at the 1960 Winter Olympics
Biathletes at the 1964 Winter Olympics
Cross-country skiers at the 1956 Winter Olympics
Cross-country skiers at the 1964 Winter Olympics
People from Les Rousses
Sportspeople from Jura (department)
20th-century French people
21st-century French people